Tami is a given name and nickname, usually feminine, which may refer to:

People

Female
 Tami (singer) (born 1964), American singer
 Tami Oldham Ashcraft, American sailor and author
 Tami Bond (born 1963 or 1964), professor of Civil and Environmental Engineering at the University of Illinois, and affiliate professor of Atmospheric Science
 Tami Bruce (born 1967), American former swimmer
 Tami Chynn (born 1984), stage name of Jamaican singer, songwriter, and dancer Tammar Anika Chin
 Tami Erin (born 1974), American actress and model born Tamara Erin Klicman
 Tami Farrell (born 1984), Miss Teen USA 2003 and Miss California USA 2009
 Tami Gold, American documentary filmmaker, visual artist and educator
 Tami Green, 21st century American politician
 Tami Grende (born 1997), Indonesian tennis player
 Tami Hetke (born 1960), American paracanoeist
 Tami Hoag (born 1959), American romance and thriller novelist
 Tami Katz-Freiman (born 1955), Israeli art historian, curator and critic
 Tami Lane (born 1974), American Oscar-winning makeup artist
 Tami Lynn (born 1942), American soul singer
 Tami Maida, first known high school quarterback and homecoming queen in 1981
 Tami Monroe (born 1970), American former pornographic actress
 Tami Neilson, member of The Neilsons Canadian country music group
 Tami Reiker (fl. 1995-present), American cinematographer
 Tami Sagher, American television comedy writer
 Tami Stronach (born 1972), Israeli-American dancer and choreographer
 Tami Whitlinger (born 1968), American former tennis player
 Tami Wiencek, American politician, member of the Iowa House of Representatives from 2007 to 2009
 Tami Zawistowski, American politician elected to the Connecticut House of Representatives in 2014

Male
 Tami Kiuru (born 1976), Finnish retired ski jumper
 Tami Mauriello (1923–1999), American boxer and actor

Fictional characters
 Tami Taylor, a character on Friday Night Lights

See also
 Tammy (given name)

Feminine given names